Operation Karbala 3 (Persian: عملیات کربلای 3) (Battle of Al-Ummiyah) was an operation during Iran–Iraq War, which was launched by Iran on 2 September 1987 with the operation code of "Hasbonallah wa Ne'mal Wakil (Persian/Arabic: حسبنا الله و نعم الوکیل)".

The main impetus of the operation was to capture and destroy two Iraq docks (Al-Umayyah and Al-Bakr). Alongside the main goal, there were other goals, too; amongst:

Fulfillment of "operation WalFajr-8" by destruction of the most significant naval base of Iraq, aborting its access through the north of Persian Gulf; making a safe naval area for shipping; and performing a naval operation and indicating a powerful presentation of Islamic Revolutionary Guard Corps naval forces in Persian Gulf.  

As a result of operation Karbala-3, Iranian forces captured more than 100 Iraqi combatants, and 63 Iraqi forces were killed. Meanwhile, Islamic Revolutionary Guard Corps of Iran annihilated 2 Iraqi fighter planes, a frigate, 15 anti-aircraft guns and 2 radar devices, plus obtaining 4 Iraqi radar devices. The operation finally finished after two days battle between Iran and Iraq.

See also 
 Operation Karbala-1
 Operation Karbala-2
 Operation Karbala-4
 Operation Karbala-5
 Operation Karbala-6
 Operation Karbala-7
 Operation Karbala-8
 Operation Karbala-9
 Operation Karbala-10

References

External links 
 Simulation of Operation Karbala-3

Iran–Iraq War
Operations Karbala
Battles involving Iran
Battles involving Iraq
1987 in Iran
1987 in Iraq